Southeast Alaska has an unusual climate that allows a large number of edible plant and edible mushroom species to grow. The area consists primarily of the Tongass National Forest, which is a temperate rainforest. This rainforest has plenty of precipitation and the temperature remains relatively constant, therefore many plant and fungi species flourish there. On a geological time scale, fairly recently during the Little Ice Age, glaciers were abundant in Southeast Alaska. The ice age's last maximum ended about 10,000 years ago. Once the glaciers retreated, they left behind nutrient-rich sediments. These nutrients in the soil enriched the ecosystem of the area.

Tlingit use
Historically the Tlingit people of the Pacific Northwest foraged off of the land. The Tlingit cuisine included everything from whales to deer, and from clams to plants. Often the Tlingit people included in their diet  many edible items from the surrounding native vegetation along with what ever seafood and wild game they were able to find. Hunting and fishing expeditions were not always successful, in which case, meals were made using the local berries, fungus, and seaweed. Because winters were long and cold in the Pacific Northwest, the Tlingit people used preserving methods in order to be able to use the gathered vegetation all winter long. Many of the edible plants that are consumed today in Southeast Alaska are eaten because of the knowledge passed down from many generations of Tlingit.

Berries

Fungi
The temperate rainforest of the Tongass National Forest often produces a great amount of mushrooms in the summer and fall months. In the ecosystem, Fungi cycle nutrients, aggregate soil, retain water, and are a source of food for many animals. There are many kinds of fungi, including Chanterelles, Boletes, Morels, and Puffballs.

Limits on harvesting
Generally speaking individuals are permitted to harvest mushrooms in the Tongass National Forest without a special license. However, it is expected that harvesters help protect the natural resources from damage. For commercial harvest, a permit is required. Harvesters must check with a local forest ranger to make sure all harvesting is legal.

Many species of mushrooms and berries can be poisonous, but look similar to the edible species. Harvesting the entire mushroom allows for easier identification as does taking note of the surroundings where the fungus was found. All harvested mushrooms need to be cooked, not eaten raw.

References

Alaska,southeast
Flora of Alaska
Edible,Alaska,southeast
Pacific temperate rainforests
Tlingit
Alaska-related lists